Tri-Continental is a Canadian blues, folk and world music group, consisting of musicians Bill Bourne, Lester Quitzau, and Madagascar Slim. They are most noted for winning the Juno Award for Roots & Traditional Album of the Year – Group at the Juno Awards of 2001, for their self-titled debut album.

Formed in the late 1990s for a festival tour blending folk and African music, they released their debut album in 2000. Bourne played acoustic guitar and fiddle, Quitzau played slide, electric and acoustic guitar, and Madagascar Slim played guitar and valiha.

Between 2002 and 2018, Tri-Continental recorded four more albums. Their most recent, Dust Dance, was released in 2018, and featured contributions from percussionist Michael Treadway.  The album received a 2020 Canadian Folk Music Award nomination in the category Pushing the Boundaries at the 15th Canadian Folk Music Awards and 2019 Album of the Year nomination at the International Folk Alliance Awards.

Bill Bourne died of cancer on 16 April 2022.

Discography
 2000 - Tri-Continental
 2002 - Live
 2003 - Let's Play
 2004 - Drifting
 2018 - Dust Dance

References

External links

 

Canadian blues musical groups
Canadian folk music groups
Canadian world music groups
Juno Award for Roots & Traditional Album of the Year – Group winners